The Sterling Heights Assembly Plant (abbrevriated SHAP), is a  automotive manufacturing factory in Sterling Heights, Michigan currently operated by Stellantis North America.

History 
The factory was opened by Chrysler under its Missile Division in 1953 to produce missiles. The nearby "Sterling Stamping" opened in 1965. The plant was operated by the US Army for a number of years and was purchased by Volkswagen of America in 1980. However, VW had entered a sales slump and never produced any vehicles at the plant. In 1983, the plant was sold to Chrysler to produce the Dodge Shadow and Plymouth Sundance.  

After the plant was modernized in 2006, the assembly line and tooling for the outgoing Stratus and Sebring were sold to OAO GAZ and  shipped to that company's factory in Nizhny Novgorod in Russia.  GAZ continued to produce the Stratus under license there through 2010, marketed as the Volga Siber.

On May 6, 2009 it was announced that the Sterling Heights Assembly plant would close by December 2010 with the adjacent stamping plant to remain open however the decision of the Chrysler board to make the new 200 model allowed it to bring new life into the plant and saved it from being closed.

In 2010 Chrysler purchased the plant from Old Carco LLC for USD$20 million. The plant will retain its current 1,200 employees. Chrysler will break ground on a new paint shop at the plant on June 21, 2011. This comes after an announcement of an 850 million dollar investment in October 2010.

When the Chrysler 200 was discontinued in December 2016, FCA announced that the Sterling Heights facility would receive a  $1.49 billion investment to retool so it can build the next-generation Ram 1500 pickup, which will be transferred from the Warren Truck Assembly so that it can build the all-new, full size Jeep Wagoneer with a planned launch in 2018.

Vehicles produced

Current 
Ram 1500 (2019–present)

Former 
 Sterling Heights Assembly
Chrysler 200 Sedan (2011–2017) and Convertible (2011–2014)
Lancia Flavia (2011–2014)
Dodge Avenger (2008–2014)
Chrysler Sebring Sedan (2001–2010) and Convertible (1996–2010)
Plymouth Breeze (1996–2000)
Dodge Stratus (1995–2006)
Chrysler Cirrus (1995–2000)
Dodge Daytona (1992–1993)
Dodge Shadow/Plymouth Sundance (1987–1994)
Chrysler LeBaron GTS/Dodge Lancer (1985–1989)
 Sterling Stamping
 Stamped metal panels

References

External links
 

Chrysler factories
Motor vehicle assembly plants in Michigan
Buildings and structures in Macomb County, Michigan
Industrial buildings completed in 1953
1953 establishments in Michigan
Sterling Heights, Michigan